Mjøsa Cities is the name of a metropolitan region around the lake Mjøsa in the counties of Oppland (population: 90,906) and Hedmark (84,547), Norway. Usually the name Mjøsbyene refers to Gjøvik, Hamar and Lillehammer but it is also used as a reference to the area in general. The largest of those cities is Hamar.

1/ km²2/ Population per km²

Metropolitan regions of Norway